The men's individual time trial cycling event at the 2015 European Games in Baku took place on 18 June.

Results

References

Men's individual time trial
2015 in men's road cycling